Sonabarighat is a town in Sonai, Cachar district, in Assam, India. The birthplace of the late Moinul Hoque Choudhury is situated at the tri-junction of the Aizawl-Sonai-Silchar road.

The town has a primary health center in the market, along with a government higher secondary school.

References

Cities and towns in Cachar district